Franklin Field , formerly Q53, is a public airport located four miles (6 km) southeast of the central business district (CBD) of Franklin in Sacramento County, California, United States. It is mostly used for general aviation. The airport was used for bomber training during World War II, and in 1947 it was acquired by the County of Sacramento.

World War II
During World War II, the airport was designated as Franklin Air Force Auxiliary Field and was an auxiliary training airfield for both Mather Army Airfield and Stockton Army Airfield, California.

Facilities & Aircraft 

 Runway 18/36: 3,240 x 60 ft (988 x 18 m), surface: asphalt
 Runway 9/27: 3,100 x 60 ft (945 x 18 m), surface: asphalt

For the 12-month period ending December 31, 2020, the airport averaged 89 aircraft operations per day, or about 32,500 per year. This was completely general aviation. For the same time period, 10 aircraft were based on the field, all single-engine airplanes.

Accidents & Incidents 
On April 25, 2004, a Piper PA-28 Cherokee made a hard landing at Franklin. While the commercial pilot and flight instructor were practicing landings, the pilot being instructed noticed that the plane was approaching too slow. As the pilot flared to land, he touched down hard on the main gear and elected to go around. As he attempted a return to his home airport, the landing gear would not lock in the extended position for some time. After landing, it was revealed that several wing ribs were substantially damaged while maintenance personnel examined the aircraft the next day. The probable cause of the incident was found to be the pilot under instruction's failure to maintain adequate airspeed on final and a misjudged flare, leading to a stall and hard landing. Contributing were the instructor's inadequate supervision and failure to initiate timely remedial action.
On October 10, 2009, a Tecnam P2004 Bravo experienced a loss of engine power on approach to Franklin Field. The aircraft received substantial damage when the nose landing gear was sheared off and the airplane nose over and came to rest inverted. The probable cause of the accident was fuel starvation due to the instructor's improper fuel system management. Neither the CFI nor the student pilot on board were injured.

See also

 California World War II Army Airfields

References 

Franklin Field (official Sacramento County Airport System site)

External links

Airports in Sacramento County, California
Airfields of the United States Army Air Forces in California
United States Army airfields